12/12/12 (also known as Evil Born) is a 2012 American horror film written and directed by Jared Cohn. It stars Sara Malakul Lane, Jesus Guevara, Erin O'Brien, Steve Hanks, and Carl Donelson. It was filmed in Los Angeles, California and released on December 4, 2012.

Plot
The film begins with a baby, Sebastian, being born. After Sebastian viciously murders the doctors who delivered him, his mother (Sara Malakul Lane) realizes that there is something seriously wrong with the child. Over the course of the film, Sebastian brutally murders many people and tragedy strikes many others. Mahari (Jesus Guevara) attempts to steal the baby from Sebastian's birth parents many times, and eventually does. He kidnaps Sebastian in order to follow his dark destiny. Police officers attempt to kill Mahari, but Mahari and his companions use Sebastian to murder them. The film ends with all the main characters dead, and their deaths were associated in some way to Sebastian.

Cast

 Sara Malakul Lane as Veronica Alvarez
 Jesus Guevara as Mahari
 Erin O'Brien as Nurse At Station
 Steve Hanks as Detective Barnes
 Carl Donelson as Carlos
 Laura Ramos as Gabriella
 Samantha Stewart as Officer Vokel
 Rachel Alig as Katherine
 Jared Cohn as Jared
 Katy-Ann Thompson as Nurse Madysson
 Gregory Niebel as Doctor Ulf
 Shakira Ja'nai Paye as Kayla
 Shauna Chin as Barbara
 Jourdan Lee as Jason Tremmel
 Jon Kondelik as Trevor
 Samuel Fisher as Officer Kemp
 Sam Ingraffia as Father Anders

Reception

Dread Central called it an "Omen-esque horror flick titled after the date on which its hellspawn will be born".  Filming the project created controversy in Thailand, in which set photos showing Sara Malakul Lane in costume looking as if pregnant were mistakenly thought to be real, for there are cultural taboos there about unwed motherhood.

See also
11/11/11 (film)
13/13/13 (film)

References

External links
  Official website
 

2012 films
2012 horror films
American supernatural horror films
2010s English-language films
The Asylum films
Films shot in Los Angeles
Films directed by Jared Cohn
2010s American films